The golden bush robin (Tarsiger chrysaeus) or golden bush-robin was first discovered in 1845 by Brian Houghton Hodgson, a British naturalist.

Description 
This species is typically a 14-15 cm long species of songbird in the family Muscicapidae known for its golden color.  The weight of a full-grown bird ranges from 12 - 15 grams.The male golden bush robins mainly have a brownish olive tone on their backs with a bright yellow-orange tone on their underside. As for female golden bush robins, they consist of the same color patterns although they are duller and not as vibrant as their male counterparts. Color patterns for a male juvenile are dark brown with buff streaks above and below the tail, while the pattern diffuses in females.

Diet 
Golden bush robins are insectivorous and focus their hunts on insects closer to the ground.

Habitat 
Their habitat is dispersed around the Himalayan mountain range and surrounding highlands of Bhutan, China, India, Myanmar, Nepal, Pakistan, Tibet, and Thailand living mainly in open areas with temperate forests, bamboo forests, grassland, and shrubland. Golden bush robins, white-browed bush robins, chestnut-crowned bush warblers, and Gould's shortwings display rare cases of exploiting human disturbance in their primary temperate forest habitat in the mountains of southern China. This behavior is likely a modification of pre-existing dietary habits as human disturbance continues to exploit natural resources in the area.

Subspecies 
The golden bush robin has two known subspecies: Tarsiger chrysaeus whistleri, which is common in parts of northern Pakistan to the northwest Himalayan mountains; and the Tarsiger chrysaeus chrysaeus, which is common in parts of the central Himalayan mountains to northwest Thailand.

Conservation Status 
The golden bush robin’s population is deemed stable and they are considered as least concern when it comes to their conservation status. The range of the golden bush robin spans multiple countries, making it difficult to fully document population trends and threats to its population.

Breeding 
The breeding season for golden bush robins in Pakistan is from May to June. The female birds tend to lay 3 or 4 eggs and their incubation period is 14 or 15 days. The nests consist of compacted moss and grass that is lined with hair, wool, and feathers. The lifespan of a golden bush robin is around 3.8 years.

References

Gallery

golden bush robin
Birds of Bhutan
Birds of China
Birds of North India
Birds of Northeast India
Birds of Nepal
Birds of Pakistan
Birds of Yunnan
golden bush robin
Taxonomy articles created by Polbot